Franz Nitterl was an Austrian weightlifter. He competed in the men's middleweight event at the 1928 Summer Olympics.

References

External links
 

Year of birth missing
Possibly living people
Austrian male weightlifters
Olympic weightlifters of Austria
Weightlifters at the 1928 Summer Olympics
Place of birth missing